Plamondon is a hamlet in northern Alberta, Canada within Lac La Biche County.

The hamlet is located in Census Division No. 12 and in the federal riding of Fort McMurray-Athabasca.

History 

The community was founded by Joseph Plamondon in 1908 and settled by primarily French-American and French Canadian pioneers. Most of the families that eventually settled there came from Provemont, Michigan (now Lake Leelanau in Leelanau County, Michigan) and from French-speaking areas of Ontario. This is mentioned in a 1991 interview with Cecelia Bussey.

North of Plamondon is Rossian. Rossian is a community of Old Believers (Old Ritualists), a Traditionalist Russian Orthodox sect whose ancestors broke from the Church after Patriarch Nikon's reforms. The Great Schism of 1666, or Raskol, resulted over reforms in church ritual and translation intended to better align the practices of the Russian Church with Greek Orthodox practices. The Old Believers that live outside Plamondon are bezpopovtsy, or Priestless Old Believers, who believe that apostolic succession ended with Nikon's apostasy and therefore have no clergy and refuse the Eucharist. Most of these families moved to the area in the mid 1970s from Woodburn, Oregon, which is also home to a large Old Believer community. Many also came from Xinjiang, China, by way of New Zealand, where they fled after the Bolshevik Revolution in Russia and the Chinese Revolution of 1949.

Demographics 

Lac La Biche County's 2016 municipal census counted a population of 348 in Plamondon, a  change from the hamlet's 2013 municipal census population of 344.

Plamondon is also home for a sizable community of Russian Orthodox Old Believers.

Economy 
The main industries in the region are logging and farming.

Amenities 
The community has two schools, Ecole Beausejour and Ecole Plamondon School, which draw students from the entire region. École Plamondon School, offers English, French immersion, and Russian classes. École Beausejour is a francophone school, with instruction surrounding with the francophone culture.

There are two hotels, two banks, post office, indoor hockey arena with artificial ice, a museum, and a rather large church.

The hamlet also holds an annual French hockey tournament called Hockey en Fête.  Frontenacs of University of Alberta have won twice. A Canadian Mud Racing Organization (CMRO) event is also held annually at the Plamondon Mud Bog.

Notable people 
Colin Piquette, former member of the Legislative Assembly of Alberta for Athabasca-Sturgeon-Redwater

See also 
List of communities in Alberta
List of designated places in Alberta
List of former urban municipalities in Alberta
List of hamlets in Alberta

References 

Hamlets in Alberta
Designated places in Alberta
Former villages in Alberta
Lac La Biche County
Old Believer communities
Russian-Canadian culture
Populated places disestablished in 2002
Populated places established in 1905